Kaz is an American crime drama and courtroom drama series that aired Sundays at 10:00 pm and Wednesdays at 9:00 pm (EST) on CBS from September 10, 1978 to April 22, 1979.

Overview
Ron Leibman starred as Martin "Kaz" Kazinski, a Polish American former convict who became a criminal defense attorney after he was released from prison. Leibman won an Emmy Award as Outstanding Lead Actor in a drama. Nevertheless, the show failed to capture an audience and was cancelled after 22 episodes due to middling ratings. The show ranked 53rd out of 114 shows that season with an average 17.0/28 rating/share.

Cast
 Ron Leibman as Martin "Kaz" Kazinski
 Patrick O'Neal as Samuel Bennett
 Linda Carlson as Katie McKenna
 Dick O'Neill as Malloy
 Edith Atwater as Illsa Fogel
 Gloria LeRoy as Mary Parnell
 Mark Withers as Peter Colcourt
 George Wyner as District Attorney Frank Revko

Episodes

References

External links
 

CBS original programming
Television series by Lorimar Television
1978 American television series debuts
1979 American television series endings
1970s American crime drama television series
1970s American legal television series
American legal drama television series
Courtroom drama television series
Television shows set in Los Angeles